This is a list of tallest buildings in Denmark.

Completed buildings

Buildings proposed or under construction

See also 
 List of tallest structures in Denmark

References

External links 
 Denmark's tallest buildings at emporis.com

Denmark
Denmark

Tallest